Live at the Budokan is a live album by Canadian musician Bryan Adams. The album was recorded live at the Nippon Budokan on June 15 & 16, 2000 in Tokyo, Japan. Adams was joined by band members Keith Scott on guitar, and Mickey Curry on drums.

The album contains both a DVD of the live concert, and a CD with fifteen of the songs recorded at the show.

CD Track listing

DVD Track listing 

Bonus (Additional Tracks)

Credits 
2003 DVD CREDITS:
Project Manager: Pamela Fisher
Producer/Editor: Edi Osghian
Project Management: Colin Logan
Assistant Editor: JR Mackie
Authoring by: Sergiy Melnik
Design: Dirk Rudolph
Technical Supervisor: Ron O Vermeulen
Audio Mixed by: Bob Clearmountain
Audio Assembling/Mastering: Chris Potter
DVD Product Manager: Jeff Fura (UME)

2000 JAPANESE TV CREW CREDITS:
Executive Producers: Katsuhito Itagaki, Akitoshi Asazuma
Director: Kiyoshi Iwasawa
Production Manager: Matt Minagawa
Assistant Director: Mika Ikeda
Technical Director: Kazuo Hibi
Switcher: Shigeo Shinjo
Camera: Motohiro Nakajima (chief), Hironobu Mizuta, Katsunori Yokochi, Jun Iwasaka, Akihito Kajiura, Hiroki Oshima, Hiroshi Nishimura
Audio: Jun Ishikawa (chief), Norishige Nojiri, Eri Kartsube, Tomohiro Izumi
Video Engineer: Takeshi Terado (chief), Koji Kuroda, Takuya Hashiba, Hideki Takahashi
Video Editor: Masahumi Ushiroebisu

References 

Bryan Adams albums
Live video albums
2003 live albums
2003 video albums
A&M Records live albums
A&M Records video albums
Albums recorded at the Nippon Budokan